The Mikveh Israel Cemetery Beth-El-Emeth at 55th and Market Streets is a Jewish cemetery in West Philadelphia founded in 1850 and dedicated in 1857 by Isaac Leeser’s Congregation Beth-El-Emeth as Beth-El-Emeth Cemetery .

Kahal Kadosh Beth-El-Emeth “Holy Congregation of the True God” (or “God of Truth”) was founded in 1857 by Joseph Newhouse as a pulpit for Rev. Isaac Leeser after Leeser left Congregation Mikveh Israel.  The congregation followed the "Spanish & Portuguese" rite despite most members hailing from Germany.  They met in a former church on the east side of Franklin Street above Green Street in the Northern Liberties neighborhood. Many of its members had formerly belonged to Mikveh Israel and rejoined it when Beth-El-Emeth dissolved itself in 1897. Congregation Mikveh Israel took possession of the Beth El Emeth Cemetery in 1895.

The cemetery is also referred to as Congregation Mikveh Israel's third cemetery.

In May 1954, vandals who had been drinking in the cemetery, overturned 33 headstones, leaving behind beer and wine bottles.

The City of Philadelphia erected a historic marker near the cemetery's location in 1998 to recognize Reverend Leeser and his contributions as a teacher and scholar.

Burials
Veterans of the Civil War are interred here along with other prominent members of the Philadelphia Jewish community.

Reverend Isaac Leeser (1806-1868) Philadelphia Jewish Leader, Educator, and Publisher.  Rabbi of Congregation Beth-El-Emeth.
Rabbi Eliezer Kleinberg, Rabbi, Cong B’nai Abraham Anshe Russia, Philadelphia.  Co-founder of the Orthodox Union.
Rabbi Dov Aryeh Leventhal (1864-1952) Chief Rabbi Philadelphia.  Son-in-law of Rabbi Eliezer Kleinberg.
Rabbi Yisroel Moshe Saks, First Rabbi, Cong B’nai Abraham Anshe Russia, Philadelphia.

See also
 Mikveh Israel Cemetery, 831 Spruce Street, Philadelphia
 Mikveh Israel Cemetery (Federal Street Burial Ground), 11th and Federal Streets, Philadelphia

References

1850 establishments in Pennsylvania
Cemeteries established in the 1850s
Cemeteries in Philadelphia
Jewish cemeteries in Pennsylvania
Jews and Judaism in Philadelphia
Sephardi Jewish culture in Pennsylvania